Subtle may refer to:

 Subtle (band), a musical group consisting of members of the anticon. hip-hop collective 
 Doctor Subtilis, John Duns Scotus
 Subtle body, an idea in mysticism, yoga and tantra
 The Subtle Knife, a novel by Philip Pullman and the second book in the trilogy His Dark Materials
 Subtle, a character in The Alchemist (play) by Ben Jonson
 Subtle, a tiling window manager